Tsentralny City District is one of the three districts of the city of Tolyatti, Russia. Population:

References

City districts of Tolyatti